The black-capped pygmy tyrant (Myiornis atricapillus) is the smallest passerine bird in its range, though larger than its cousin, the short-tailed pygmy tyrant. This tyrant flycatcher occurs from Costa Rica to north-western Ecuador.

It is a species of the forest canopy, coming lower at edges and clearings, and in second growth and semi-open woodland. It occurs up to an altitude of 900 m. It is fairly common, except in arid areas. In Costa Rica and most of Panama it is restricted to the Caribbean lowlands, while essentially restricted to the humid parts of the Chocó further south. The female builds a 15 cm long pouch nest with a round side entrance, which is suspended from a thin branch 1–7 m high in a tree.  The female incubates the two brown-blotched white eggs for 15–16 days to hatching.

The black-capped pygmy tyrant is a tiny short-tailed bird, 6.5 cm long, and weighing 5.2 g. The crown is black, shading to dark grey on the rest of the head, and contrasting with the white “spectacles”.  The rest of the upperparts are olive-green. The tail and the wings are blackish with yellow edging to the feathers and two yellow wing bars. The throat and central breast are white, shading to grey on the flanks and pale yellow on the belly. The sexes are similar, but females have a duller, sootier crown, and young birds have a browner crown and upperparts, and their wing markings and underparts are tinged with buff.

The black-capped pygmy tyrant can be seen alone, in pairs, or family groups, hunting small insects in rapid dashes.

The call is a thin ttseep which can be confused with an insect or frog. Family groups also communicate with soft whistles and trills.

References

 Stiles and Skutch,  A guide to the birds of Costa Rica,

External links
Videos, photos and sounds - The Internet Bird Collection

black-capped pygmy tyrant
Birds of Costa Rica
Birds of Panama
Birds of Colombia
Birds of the Tumbes-Chocó-Magdalena
black-capped pygmy tyrant